Piedmont Atlanta Hospital is a 643 bed, non-profit hospital located at 1968 Peachtree Road, Atlanta, Georgia.

History

Piedmont was established in 1905 as the Piedmont Sanitarium, the successor to Amster's private sanitorium, in the former mansion of Charles Thomas Swift of S.S.S. Tonic. The mansion was located at the northwest corner of Capitol and Crumley streets in the then-affluent Washington-Rawson neighborhood. The name was changed to Piedmont Hospital and eventually the hospital took up an entire square block. The Washington-Rawson neighborhood was razed in the early 1960s to make way for Atlanta–Fulton County Stadium and its parking lots; now the site is part of the large Center Parc Stadium parking lot.

External links
Piedmont Atlanta Hospital
Piedmont Mountainside Hospital
Piedmont Fayette Hospital
Piedmont Newnan Hospital
Piedmont Henry Hospital
Piedmont Athens Regional Hospital
Piedmont Columbus Regional
Piedmont Macon Medical Center
Piedmont Macon North Hospital

References

Hospitals in Atlanta
Hospitals established in 1905
1905 establishments in Georgia (U.S. state)